Keith Nichols (13 February 1945 – 21 January 2021) was an English jazz multi-instrumentalist and arranger, a player of the piano, trombone, reeds, and accordion.

Biography
Born in Ilford, Essex, England, Nichols was a child actor and an award-winning accordionist in his youth. He began by playing ragtime tunes, gaining notice in the 1970s in London when forming the band New Sedalia. Nichols also formed the Ragtime Orchestra in the mid-1970s, along with Mo Morris, Richard Warner and Paul Nossiter. Nichols recorded and gigged with Bing Crosby, and Dick Sudhalter during this period. Over time, he moved on to Dixieland jazz, Swing, and orchestral Jazz, including the oeuvres of Paul Whiteman and Duke Ellington.

Nichols was also a frequent sideman for the EMI record label and an arranger for the New York Jazz Repertory Company, Dick Hyman and the Pasadena Roof Orchestra. In 1978, he helped lead the Midnite Follies Orchestra with Alan Cohen. Other artists Nichols worked with include Digby Fairweather, Harry Gold, Richard Pite and Claus Jacobi. He died of COVID-19 during the COVID-19 pandemic in the United Kingdom on 21 January 2021, at The Royal London Hospital.

Discography
Paramount Theatre Orchestra (1984) (LP, Stomp Off)
 Lolly Pops
Dreamland Syncopators
 Territory Jazz (1987) (LP, Stomp Off) 
Julian Vincent and Keith Nichols
 Morton to Mozart (1989) (CD, Poppy HXP012) 
Keith Nichols' Cotton Club Gang and Janice Day with Guy Barker
 I Like To Do Things For You (1991) (CD, Stomp Off)
Keith Nichols and the Cotton Club Orchestra
 Syncopated Jamboree (1991) (CD, Stomp Off CD 1242)
 Henderson Stomp (1993) (CD, Stomp Off CD 1234)
 Harlem's Arabian Nights (1997) (CD, Stomp Off CD 130)
Keith Nichols' Little Devils
 The Charmful Little Armful (2003) (PEK)
Keith Nichols and the Blue Devils
 Kansas City Breakdown (2004) (CD, Stomp Off CD 1387)
Keith Nichols' Earthbound Spirits
 Harlem Madness (2004) (CD, PKCD-237)
Keith Nichols' Collegians 
 Collegiate Rhythm (2006) (CD, PEK PKCD-299)
Mike Lovell and Keith Nichols
 Dixieland at the Thornton Little Theatre (2006) (CD, PEK)
Keith Nichols' Jazz Artists and Northern Sinfonia
 A Tribute to Paul Whiteman (2007) (CD, Lake Records LACD245)
Thomas "Spats" Langham / Keith Nichols / Richard Pite
 London Omnibus (2010) (Jazz Repertory Company)
The Nichols-Duffee International Jazz Orchestra
 One More Time (2013) (CD, Lake)

References

External links
 
 
 

1945 births
2021 deaths
Stride pianists
Dixieland revivalist pianists
English jazz pianists
English jazz trombonists
Male trombonists
British male pianists
21st-century pianists
21st-century trombonists
21st-century British male musicians
British male jazz musicians
Deaths from the COVID-19 pandemic in England
Stomp Off artists